Dùn-Àluinn (1912) by Iain MacCormaic (1860–1947) was the first full-length novel in Scottish Gaelic literature. It was first published as a weekly serial in the People's Journal May - September 1910. Iain MacCormaic had also published a novella, Gun d'thug i speis do'n Armunn a few years before. The name is sometimes anglicised as Dunaline.

It was closely followed by Angus Robertson's An t-Ogha Mòr, which had actually been serialised prior to Dun Aluinn's publication, and so vies for the position of first novel.

Plot summary
It is about the horror of the Highland Clearances, and the heir of a despotic landlord, Cailean Og, who is disinherited. The most interesting character is the Church of Scotland minister who gives a sermon about social rights. For a novel of its period, it is fairly cosmopolitan, and the action ranges to locations as exotic as gold mines in New Zealand.

References
DÙN-ÀLUINN

Scottish novels
1912 British novels
Scottish Gaelic literature
Novels first published in serial form
Works originally published in British magazines
Scottish Gaelic novelists
Highland Clearances